Andrew Astbury (born 29 November 1960) is an English former competitive swimmer who represented Great Britain at the Olympics and England in the Commonwealth Games in the late 1970s and early 1980s.

Swimming career
In his international swimming debut as an 18-year-old, Astbury represented England at the 1978 Commonwealth Games in Edmonton, Alberta, Canada, where he received a bronze medal for this third-place finish in the men's 1500-metre freestyle.

In the first of two consecutive Summer Olympics in which he appeared, Astbury swam for Great Britain at the 1980 Summer Olympics in Moscow.  He was a member of the sixth-place British team in the men's 4x200-metre freestyle relay.  In individual competition, he also competed in the preliminary heats of the 400 and 1500-metre freestyle events.

Competing for England at the 1982 Commonwealth Games in Brisbane, Australia, Astbury won gold medals in the 200-metre and 400-metre freestyle races in Commonwealth record times.  He also won a silver medal as a member of the English men's team in the 4x200-metre freestyle relay, and a bronze medal in the 1500-metre freestyle.

At the 1984 Summer Olympics in Los Angeles, California, he claimed the bronze medal in the 4×200-metre freestyle relay, together with British teammates Neil Cochran, Paul Easter and Paul Howe, finishing behind the Americans and West Germans.  He also advanced to the B Final of the 400-metre freestyle, finishing sixth in the consolation final (14th overall), and competed in the preliminary heats of the 1500-metre freestyle.

He won the 1981 ASA National Championship 200 metres freestyle title and the 400 metres freestyle in 1980, 1981 and 1982. He also won the ASA British National 1500 metres freestyle title four times from 1980 to 1983.

See also
 List of Commonwealth Games medallists in swimming (men)
 List of Olympic medalists in swimming (men)

References

 British Olympic Association athlete profile

External links
 
 
 
 
 

1960 births
Living people
Commonwealth Games gold medallists for England
Commonwealth Games silver medallists for England
Commonwealth Games bronze medallists for England
English Olympic medallists
English male freestyle swimmers
Olympic bronze medallists for Great Britain
Olympic bronze medalists in swimming
Olympic swimmers of Great Britain
Swimmers at the 1980 Summer Olympics
Swimmers at the 1984 Summer Olympics
Swimmers at the 1982 Commonwealth Games
Sportspeople from Leeds
Medalists at the 1984 Summer Olympics
Commonwealth Games medallists in swimming
Medallists at the 1982 Commonwealth Games